Pei Jiayun (born 20 June 1971) is a Chinese rower. At the 1993 World Rowing Championships in Račice, Czech Republic, she won a gold medal in the women's coxless four. She also competed at the 1992 Summer Olympics.

Her husband was a victim of the COVID-19 pandemic.

References

Chinese female rowers
1971 births
Living people
World Rowing Championships medalists for China
Asian Games medalists in rowing
Rowers at the 1994 Asian Games
Asian Games gold medalists for China
Medalists at the 1994 Asian Games
Olympic rowers of China
Rowers at the 1992 Summer Olympics
20th-century Chinese women
21st-century Chinese women